Juan Carlos Oxoby (17 December 1931 – 9 January 2010) was an Argentine sports shooter. He competed in the 25 metre pistol event at the 1964 Summer Olympics.

References

External links
 

1931 births
2010 deaths
Argentine male sport shooters
Olympic shooters of Argentina
Shooters at the 1964 Summer Olympics
Place of birth missing